Pratyabhijñā or Pratyabhigyā is an idealistic, monistic, and theistic school of philosophy in Kashmir Shaivism which originated in the ninth century CE. The term Trika was used by Abhinavagupta to represent the whole of Kashmir Shaivism, or to designate the Pratyabhijñā system.

The name of the system is derived from its most famous work, Īśvara-pratyabhijñā-kārikā by Utpaladeva. Etymologically, pratyabhijñā is formed from prati- ("re-") + abhi- ("closely") + *jñā ("to know"), so the meaning is "direct knowledge of one's self," "recognition."

The central thesis of this philosophy is that everything is absolute consciousness, termed Śiva, and it is possible to "re-cognise" this fundamental reality and be freed from limitations, identified with Śiva and immersed in bliss. Thus, the slave (paśu: the human condition) shakes off the fetters (pāśa) and becomes the master (pati: the divine condition).

Masters and texts
The Pratyabhijñā system had a period of intense development between the ninth and the eleventh centuries, with a lineage of masters and disciples who wrote treatises and mystical poetry.

The founder of the Pratyabhijñā school was Somananda (875–925 CE); his work Śivadṛṣṭi is the basis of the system. He was followed by his son and disciple Utpaladeva (900–950 CE) who wrote the most important treatise of the system, Īśvara-pratyabhijñā-kārikā, a philosophical treatise discussing the fundamental doctrine of the school and comparing it with various rival schools, analysing the differences and refuting them in the style of Buddhist logic. The name of the school is derived from the title of this work; in the rest of India, the whole Kashmiri Shaivite philosophy was sometimes referred to by the name Pratyabhijñā Śāstra.

Another important master of this school is Abhinavagupta, who carried out a synthesis between various schools of Kashmir Shaivism in his magnum opus, Tantrāloka; Abhinavagupta also wrote two commentaries on Īśvara-pratyabhijñā-kārikā. The disciple of Abhinavagupta, Kshemaraja, wrote a digest of the Pratyabhijñā philosophy called Pratyabhijñāhṛdayam, The Essence of Re-cognition, which is the most popular introduction to the system.

Context

In relation to Advaita Vedanta

With regard to the problem of how the world comes by, Utpaladeva rejects the Advaita Vedānta theory of eternal and independent ignorance (avidyā), which affirms that brahman (the absolute consciousness) is being affected by avidyā (eternal ignorance) by superposition, with a resulting enslavement of the inactive, subject consciousness to worldly life. In Kashmir Shaivism, avidyā (ignorance) and its cosmic aspect, māyā (illusion), are nothing but Śakti, the power of Śiva; as Śakti, they are real for limited beings, but are simple manifestations of consciousness for Śiva.

In Advaita Vedānta, with regard to the limited being (jīva), all activity belongs to the intellect (buddhi); in Kashmir Shaivism, activity is also ascribed to ātman, who is not inert, but in possession of the five-fold actions of creation, maintenance, dissolution, occultation, and grace. A liberated jīva, in Advaita Vedānta, is freed from the universe—but here, the universe appears as the real I-consciousness, a mass of consciousness and bliss.

In Advaita Vedanta, consciousness (cit) is only light (prakāśa), but in Pratyabhijñā it is also activity, doer-ship.

Compared with other Kashmir Shaivism schools
In the context of Kashmiri Shaivism, Pratyabhijñā is sometimes classified as śāmbhavopāya (the path of Shambhu, i.e., Śiva), and at other times as aṇupāya (the non-path). Śambhavopaya and Anupaya are classes of practices related to consciousness directly; by contrast, the lower two classes of practice are Śaktopaya—the path of Śakti, which relates to the mind—and Anavopaya—the path of the limited being, which relates to the physical body. Thus, Pratyabhijñā is considered to be the shortest, most direct path to liberation, an evolution based on consciousness alone.

Even though it shares the same practices relating to the ascension of kundalini in the middle channel (sushumna nadi), Pratyabhijñā claims instantaneous progression, while the Krama school maintains there is gradual progression.

With regard to the Spanda school, Pratyabhijñā is more philosophical, putting the accent on instantaneous realisation (recognition) of the Ultimate, while the Spanda school is more practical (as per its fundamental text, Spandakārikā), and puts its accent on the vibrating energy aspect of consciousness.

In relation to Buddhism
The most important difference between Pratyabhijñā and Buddhism is related to the ontological ultimate: while Buddhism rejects the concepts of soul (atman) and god (īśvara), the Kashmiri Shaivites put them at the top of their world model.

In his philosophical treatise Īśvara-pratyabhijñā-kārikā, Utpaladeva also rejects the vasana theory (the dream model of the world) of the Sautrāntika school of Buddhist philosophy; he suggests another model for idealism: Śiva, who is pure consciousness, manifests all objects internally, by virtue of his free will, svātantrya, and the objects appear as real and external to limited beings. He appeals to the analogy of the famed materialisation of objects by advanced yogins, purely by using their psychic powers.

Tenets

Ābhāsa-vāda and Svātantrya-vāda 
Ābhāsa (ā- – slight, bhāsa – manifestation) – i.e. appearance in a limited way, or "slight manifestation of Śiva"  is the Pratyabhijñā theory of manifestation. The supreme consciousness (samvit) is like a mirror and the universe is like a reflection appearing in it. The mirror analogy is often used to explain abhāsa because a mirror, like consciousness, can contain an infinity of different images without being itself affected.

Pratyabhijñā affirms that the universe appears as an ābhāsa in the mirror of supreme consciousness, samvit, but unlike a physical mirror which needs an external object to form a reflection, the image in the mirror of samvit is projected by samvit itself – this activity is called svātantrya, power of will. In other words, the universe appears inside samvit because Śiva so desires.

Advaita Vedanta proposes a somewhat similar theory of universe as an illusion superimposed on consciousness. The difference in Pratyabhijñā is that the cause of manifestation is not an eternal separate principle of ignorance (avidyā), but the will of Śiva, and the creation itself is ontologically real, not just an illusion. It is made of ābhāsas, which are nothing but the ideation of Śiva appearing as empirical objects.

Thus, all things are ābhāsa: earth, water, fire, etc. All their qualities are ābhāsa. Complex ābhāsas are compose from simpler ābhāsas, culminating with the whole world.

Paradoxically, even though ābhāsas have the nature of consciousness, they also exist externally on account of being manifested through the occultation power (maya) by Śiva. An advanced meditator is capable of seeing the world as ābhāsa, a flash of consciousness (cit) and bliss (ānanda), identical with his own self (ātman) and non-differentiated (abheda). In other words, the light of consciousness shines from within the object of perception, as an intuition, a super-human direct kind of vision.

If the universe is contemplated from the point of view of manifestation, it appears as ābhāsa, but when contemplated from the point of view of the Ultimate Reality, it appears as svātantrya. Svātantrya is the complementary concept of ābhāsa accounting for the initial impulse of manifestation. The theory of svātantrya affirms that Śiva, the fundamental Reality, appears as distinct subjects and objects, but this does not conceal his real nature. Thus, the free will of Śiva, which is absolute unity, is to manifest, to create multiplicity. This impulse to create is Śiva's playful nature (lilā).

The world

The ābhāsa concept focuses on the essential nature of manifestation. In order to analyze in detail the nature of stuff (tattva - literally "that-ness") the Pratyabhijñā system appropriated the 25 tattva ontology of Samkhya and improved on it by expanding the upper tattvas. Instead of Spirit (Purusha) and Nature (Prakriti), Kashmir Shaivism has five pure tattvas representing the Ultimate Reality and then six more representing the occultation process (māyā) which translates the non-dual pure Reality to time and space limited world and its subjects.

Soul
The soul (jivātman) is the projection of Śiva in manifestation. When taking on the five limitations (kañcuka) the infinite spirit appears as integrated in space and time, with limited powers of action and knowledge and a sense of incompleteness.

These five constrictions are the result of the action of an impurity called āṇava māla. Its function is to make the unlimited appear as limited and severed from the whole. This does not mean that jīvātman is limited, it just appears so on account of ignorance. Jīvātman is not created or born, but rather has the same status as Śiva, performing on a small scale the same actions that Śiva performs on a universal scale – creation, maintenance, dissolution, occultation and grace. However, his powers are circumscribed by mālas.

In order to open jīvātman towards external objects it is placed within the subtle body, also known as the mental apparatus or puryaṣṭaka – the eight gated fortress of the soul. The eight gates are the five elements – earth, water, fire, air, aether plus the sensorial mental (manas), ego (ahamkāra) and intellect (buddhi).

Jīvātman is further limited by two more impurities, in addition to the first one, āṇava māla – the limitation of atomicity. Through the next impurity, māyīya māla, things appear as dual / differentiated. The limited subject, jīvātman, is immersed in a world full of external objects, in a fundamental duality between self and non-self.

Furthermore, through the third impurity – kārma māla – the subject has the illusion that he is the doer, though, limited in power. Atman, by contrast, when acts, is identified with Śiva and acts as a part of Śiva.

That is why the limited soul is described as enslaved (paśu) while Śiva is the master (pati). By purification of the three impurities the limited soul too can recognize (Pratyabhijñā) his real nature, becoming pati himself.

Impurity
The māla (meaning "dirt" or "impurity")  theory states that the infinite self, atman, is reduced and limited by three forces produced by Śiva. Śiva, by exercising his free will – svātāntrya, takes contraction upon himself and manifests as countless atoms of consciousness (cidaṇu – consciousness quantas). Cidaṇu are enwrapped by material vestment.

As discussed above, the three malas are āṇava māla – the limitation of smallness, māyīya māla - the limitation of illusion and kārma māla – limitation of doership. Kārma māla exists in the physical body, māyīya māla in the subtle body, and āṇava māla in the causal body. Āṇava māla affects the spirit and contracts the will, māyīya māla affects the mind and creates duality, kārma māla affects the body and creates good and bad actions. They correspond to individuality, mind and body.

Of the three limitations, only the first one, āṇava māla, which is the basis of the other two, is impossible to surpass through effort alone, without the help of divine grace (śaktipāt). Āṇava māla is manifested as residual impressions existing in the causal body (subconscious mind). It is the combined effect of the five limitations (kañcuka) taken together, the gateway from limited towards the unlimited, from the pure-impure (bheda-abheda) world of the ego towards the pure reality of the first five tattvas, culminating with Śiva and Śakti.

Māyīya māla manifests as the mind. In Pratyabhijñā, the mind is seen as the root of illusion. The concept of mind here is different from Buddhism. In Buddhism, mind collates the aspect of awareness. Here, it is only related to the activity of thought forms, emotions, ego and the five senses. Thus, all cognitions being limited perceptions of the absolute, are illusions, on account of containing a sense of duality.

Kārma māla manifests the physical body. Its essence is limitation of the power of action and the illusion of individual agency, the effect of which is the accumulation of karma in the causal body.

The maturity of malas of a person is related to the level of grace (śaktipāt) he is able to receive. With dedicated practice, kārma māla and māyiya māla can be surpassed, but then the practitioner must put his fate in the hands of Śiva, as Śiva alone can bestow the grace of lifting āṇava māla and helping him recognize (pratyabhijñā) his essential nature.

Liberation
In Pratyabhijñā, the concept of liberation (mokṣa) is the recognition (pratyabhijñā) of the original, innate awareness of self in which all this universe appears as Śiva-consciousness.  That liberated being also attains what is called cid-ānanda (consciousness-bliss). In its highest form, this bliss is known as jagad-ānanda, literally meaning the bliss (ānanda) of the whole world (jagat).

In jagad-ānanda the universe appears as the Self (ātman). In a practical way the definition says that, when there is no need to sit in meditation for samādhi, that is jagad-ānanda, because then nothing except the supreme consciousness (samvit) is perceived. The mind rests in the unlimited consciousness the inside becomes outside and vice versa, and there is a sense of oneness and total immersion. No matter what the liberated being is doing (eating, walking, even sleeping), he experiences bliss of the deepest level.

Spiritual practices

The purpose of Pratyabhijñā is the recognition of the Śiva nature of the world (and oneself). In order to achieve that, it is necessary to induce a modified state of consciousness through the use of Śakti. Śakti, loosely translated as energy, is the dynamic aspect of Śiva, the link between finite (the human subject) and infinite (Śiva). Thus comes about the fundamental principle: "Without the help of Śakti, pratyabhijñā is impossible".

In order to awaken Śakti, the practice of "unfoldment of the middle" is prescribed. The middle has multiple meanings here: in its most basic form, it refers to the psychic channel passing through the spine (suṣumnā nādī) which is physically the central axis of the body. Unfoldment in the suṣumnā nādī is achieved by focusing the ascending breath (prana) and descending  breath (apana) inside it. Thus, the two opposing tendencies being fused together a state of non-differentiation is achieved and the Kundalini energy ascends.

Another meaning of the "middle" is that of void or emptiness, but it does not refer to a lack of cognition, rather, it is a lack of duality in cognition. There are three principal manifestations of the void in the body: the lower one – void of the heart – associated with heart chakra, the second one is the intermediary void associated with the channel suṣumnā nādī and the third void is called "supreme" and associated with the crown chakra. To unfold these three voids entails a number of practices of focusing and surrender of consciousness in those three places.

A third meaning of "middle" is "the state which exists in-between cognitions, when one thought has ended and another one has not yet begun". These moments are considered essential for the revelation of the true nature of the mind. The usual practices are: dual thought destruction (vikalpa-kṣaya), withdrawing of the cognitive energies into the heart (śakti-saṅkoca), expansion of non-dual awareness into the external perceptions (śakti-vikāsa) and generating hiatus moments in thinking, when the pure awareness of the Self might be easier to apprehend (vaha-ccheda).

Let us review a few of the most important practices in more detail:

Pañca-kṛtya – meditation on the five actions 

Pañca-kṛtya is a general practice which underlies all the other practices. An essential feature of Kashmir Shaivism is the concept of activity inside the ultimate consciousness. Śiva acts, and his most important actions are five in number: creation, maintenance, dissolution, occultation and grace. But the limited beings are identical to Śiva, as nothing but Śiva exists, so, they too have the same five actions, on a limited scale.

These five actions are the object of meditation. They are associated with all the stages of cognition: creation is the initiation of a perception or thought, maintenance is dwelling on it, dissolution is returning of consciousness in its center. Then, the last two actions are associated with the movement towards duality and non-duality

The purpose of the meditation on the five actions is their dissolution into the void. This process is described with such metaphors as "hathapaka" meaning violent digestion, devouring something whole, in one gulp and "alamgrasa" – complete consumption of the experience.

In practice, a state of non-duality (Turiya) is over-imposed over the normal cognitions of daily life. Pratyabhijñā is not focused on formal practice, but rather it is a philosophy of life. All moments of life are good for pañca-kṛtya practice, as all cognitions can lead to the revelation of the Self. As experiences accumulate into the subject, they are to be burned into sameness. Through this device the karmic element is eliminated from one's actions, or, in other words, duality is digested out of experiences.

This process is one of microscopic, moment by moment noticing of experience and reframing it into the perspective of the non-dual subject. All experiences tend to leave subconscious traces, especially the negative ones. Such experiences are reduced to a "seed form", to spring forth again into existence, becoming memories or patterns of behavior. Whenever blocks arise in life, one should know they are just inside his consciousness and perform hathapaka to dissolve them.

This is in no way an analytical or dry activity. As this practice advances, a feeling of spontaneous delight (camatkara), not unlike an artistic experience, consumes the object of the experience spontaneously, as it appears. The body itself it charged with an intense state of bliss and consciousness is expanded beyond duality. In this state the aim of Pratyabhijñā is realized inside the purified body and mind of the practitioner.

Vikalpa-kṣaya – dissolution of dualizing thought

The most direct application of pañca-kṛtya (the observation of the five actions of consciousness) is Vikalpa Kshaya, literally meaning "dissolution of thoughts". It is an activity by which the dualizing content of cognitions is dissolved into Atman, which is nondual by excellence. What remains is called avikalpa, that is, pure awareness.

A similar concept is citta-vṛtti-nirodha  – the cessation of mental fluctuations. This verse is the famous definition of yoga from Yoga Sutras of Patanjali. There is also similarity with Vipasana, the Zen and Dzogchen traditions.

By focusing on the pure awareness substrate of cognition instead of the external objects, the practitioner reaches illumination. Dualizing thought constructs must be eliminated and in their place the light and ecstasy of pure awareness shines as the real nature of cognition.

Repeating the gesture of vikalpa-kṣaya with all thoughts, as they appear, there is a gradual transformation at the subconscious level (causal body), leading towards identity with Śiva. Thus, the process resembles the pruning of the weeds in a garden.

Vikalpa-kṣaya is also the classical technique for calming the agitated mind. In order to capture the underlying consciousness on the surface of which vikalpas have their play, the yogi enters a state of surrender, or, in other words an "alert passivity", because the use of force in this case would only lead to more mental agitation.

As vikalpas are being consumed in the light of consciousness, ānanda also appears. An accumulation of repeated experiences of identification with ātman in a state of intoxication with bliss form the foundation for stable samādhi.

A number of practical suggestions are offered in the Pratyabhijñā texts: to concentrate on dvadasanta (above the crown chakra), to enter the void that exists between the moment one thought ends and another appears, or similarly, on the space existing between inhalation and exhalation  and to concentrate on an intense artistic emotion.

Vaha-cheda – cutting of the inner energy currents

Vaha-cheda (cutting the two vital currents, prāṇa and apāna) leads to illumination by resting the ascending and descending  in the heart. By bringing a cessation to the dualizing activity of prāṇa and apāna, equilibrium is reached, and in this superior condition the true nature of the heart shines forth. A cryptic indication is to mentally pronounce consonants such as "k" without the supporting vowel ("a"). This paradoxical concept acts as a mechanism to induce a moment of hiatus in the mental activity, when the tension and pain are cleared. Such a technique belongs to the āṇavopāya  (the lowest of the three categories of techniques in Kashmir Shaivism).

Śakti-saṅkoca – contraction of the sense energies in the heart

Śakti-saṅkoca is an illumination technique based on the activation of the heart (the locus of projection of Atman) by retraction of one's energies back into their source. After letting the sense-organs reach to external objects, by bringing them back into the heart, all the energies of the five senses are accumulated inside (pratyāhara). Just like a scared tortoise brings its limbs back into the shell, so the yogi should retract his Śaktis (energies of the senses) into ātman. This reversal of the sense organs is intended to awaken the recognition of the real nature of the heart.

Śakti-vikāsa – recognition of the self into the sense objects

Śakti-vikāsa is a method to dissolve duality (vikalpa-kṣaya) out of the stream of sensorial impressions. While being engaged in the sense activity, the yogi should remain centered in ātman (his heart), thus superposing the external perceptions onto the light of is revealed heart. This mental attitude is also called bhairavī mudra. Its effect is the realization of the nonduality of the external reality by recognizing the same essential nature (ātman, or Śiva) in all cognitions. Thus, the yogi attains stabilization of his nondual vision through systematic practice. Both Śakti-sankoca and Śakti-vikāsa are considered śaktopāya techniques – the intermediary category, of the mind.

Adyanta-koṭi-nibhālana – meditation on the moment between breaths

There is a class of techniques which use two special moments in the breath cycle to achieve recognition of one's nature. If we consider the polarity of the upward moving current (prāṇa) as positive, and the opposing current (apāna) as negative, then the polarity of the inner energy currents reach zero – equilibrium – in the moments of rest between inhalation and exhalation. Those moments are targeted with the mental recitation of the two syllables of the ajapa mantra so-'ham or ham-sa. The locus of attention should be in the regions of the heart (anāhata) and above the crown (dvādaśānta). The continuous movement to and fro of awareness in-between these two centers, which are associated with two manifestations of the void – the void of the heart and the supreme void, brings about the activation of the median channel (suṣumnā nādī) and a state of non-duality.

References

Further reading
 Christopher Wallis (2017). The Recognition Sutras. Mattamayura Press. .

 
 
 
 
 
 Tejomayananda, Swami. Introduction to Kashmir Shaivism. Gurudev Siddha Peeth, 1979.

Hindu denominations
Kashmir Shaivism
Theistic Indian philosophy
Advaita Shaivism